or  is a lake that lies on the border of the municipalities of Steigen and Hamarøy in Nordland county, Norway.

See also
List of lakes in Norway

References

Steigen
Hamarøy
Lakes of Nordland